Ruslan Shauvkhalov (born 31 December 1996), is a Chechen football midfielder who plays for Dacia Chișinău.

References

External links
 

1996 births
Living people
FC Dacia Chișinău players
Russian expatriate sportspeople in Moldova
Russian footballers
Russian people of Chechen descent
Association football midfielders
Moldovan Super Liga players
Russian expatriate footballers
Expatriate footballers in Moldova
Sportspeople from Chechnya